Don Henry or Donald Henry can refer to:

 Don Henry (environmentalist), Australian environmentalist
 Don Henry (musician), American musician
 Don Henry, American murder victim in the death of Don Henry and Kevin Ives
 Donald Henry (cricketer) (1885-1973), Australian cricketer